Pasto is a barrio in the municipality of Coamo, Puerto Rico. Its population in 2010 was 5,540.

History
Puerto Rico was ceded by Spain in the aftermath of the Spanish–American War under the terms of the Treaty of Paris of 1898 and became an unincorporated territory of the United States. In 1899, the United States Department of War conducted a census of Puerto Rico finding that the population of Pasto barrio was 1,272.

Florencio Santiago
Florencio Santiago, born in 1855, was from Pasto. He was a philanthropist who studied at Boston University and donated most of his patrimony, which was used for the building of many structures in Coamo, including the central plaza in Coamo barrio-pueblo. A street and a school in Coamo are named after him.

See also

 List of communities in Puerto Rico

References

External links
 

Barrios of Coamo, Puerto Rico